Zhou Xin (born 11 April 1998) is a Chinese footballer currently playing as a defender for Shenzhen.

Club career
Zhou Xin would start his football development in Shenzhen before joining the Guangzhou Evergrande youth team. A move abroad to further his development would see him join Norwegian club Stabæk where he would be promoted to their reserve team Stabæk II, who were allowed to play within the 2. divisjon in the Norwegian pyramid. He would make his senior debut in a league game on 7 May 2018 against Elverum Fotball in a 3-3 draw. On 26 February 2019 top tier club Shenzhen would sign him to play within the 2019 Chinese Super League campaign. He would go on to make his debut for Shenzhen in a league game against Hebei China Fortune F.C. on the 2 March 2019 in a 3-1 victory.

Career statistics

References

External links

1998 births
Living people
Chinese footballers
Chinese expatriate footballers
Association football defenders
Norwegian Second Division players
Chinese Super League players
Stabæk Fotball players
Shenzhen F.C. players
Expatriate footballers in Norway
Chinese expatriate sportspeople in Norway